Hrithik Roshan is an Indian actor known for his work in Hindi-language films. As a child, he made uncredited appearances in three films directed by his maternal grandfather, J. Om Prakash, the first of which was in Aasha (1980). In 1986, Roshan played the adopted son of Rajinikanth's character in Prakash's crime drama Bhagwaan Dada. Roshan subsequently worked as an assistant director on four films, including Khudgarz (1987) and Karan Arjun (1995), all of which were directed by his father, Rakesh.

Roshan's first leading role came opposite Ameesha Patel in Kaho Naa... Pyaar Hai (2000), a highly successful romantic drama directed by his father, for which he won two Filmfare AwardsBest Male Debut and Best Actor. In 2001, Roshan played a supporting role in Karan Johar's lucrative ensemble melodrama Kabhi Khushi Kabhie Gham.... This initial success was followed by roles in a series of critical and commercial failures, including Aap Mujhe Achche Lagne Lage (2002) and Main Prem Ki Diwani Hoon (2003), leading critics to believe that Roshan's career was over. His career prospects improved in 2003 when he played the role of a mentally disabled teenager in his father's science fiction film Koi... Mil Gaya. The film emerged as one of the highest-grossing Bollywood film of that year and earned Roshan the Best Actor – Critics and the Best Actor awards at Filmfare. His next release, the war drama Lakshya (2004), performed poorly at the box office despite earning positive reviews.

In 2006, Roshan starred in two top-grossing productions of the year. He portrayed the eponymous superhero in Krrish, a sequel to Koi... Mil Gaya, and won another Best Actor award at Filmfare for playing a thief in the adventure film Dhoom 2. Two years later, he gained a fourth Best Actor award at Filmfare for playing the Mughal emperor Akbar in Ashutosh Gowariker's period romance Jodhaa Akbar (2008). Roshan starred in two commercially unsuccessful films of 2010Kites and Guzaarishbut earned praise for portraying a quadriplegic magician in the latter. In 2011, he featured as a talent judge for the television dance reality show Just Dance. Roshan also played one of the three leads alongside Farhan Akhtar and Abhay Deol in the Zoya Akhtar-directed comedy-drama Zindagi Na Milegi Dobara (2011), following which he played a man seeking vengeance in Agneepath (2012), a remake of the 1990 film of the same name. In 2013, Roshan starred in the third installment of the Krrish franchise, and the following year, he starred in Bang Bang!, a remake of the 2010 Hollywood film Knight and Day. These films rank among his biggest commercially successes. In 2019, Roshan starred in the biopic Super 30, in which he portrayed the mathematician Anand Kumar, and in the action thriller War, which ranks as his highest-grossing release. His first film in three years, the action thriller Vikram Vedha (2022), was not financially profitable despite positive reviews.

Film

Television

Music video appearances

Footnote
Roshan played dual roles in the Krish franchise film.

See also
 Awards and nominations received by Hrithik Roshan

References

External links
 
 Hrithik Roshan on Bollywood Hungama

Indian filmographies
Male actor filmographies